Deskford (Scottish Gaelic: Deasgard) is a parish and a small settlement in Moray, Scotland, formerly in Banffshire.

A number of significant historical and archaeological remains have been found in the area, notably the remains of a carnyx.

See also
 List of listed buildings in Deskford, Moray

References

Villages in Moray
Civil parishes of Scotland